"Tell Me Who" is a song by Canadian recording artist Tamia. It was written by Tamia and frequent collaborator Shep Crawford for her second studio album A Nu Day (2000), while production was helmed by the latter. Released as the album's third and final single,  following the top ten success of "Stranger in My House", it peaked at number two on Billboards Dance Club Songs chart.

Track listing
All tracks written by Shep Crawford and Washington.

Notes
 denotes additional producer

Credits and personnel 
Credits adapted from the liner notes of A Nu Day.

Merlin Bobb – executive producer
Anne Catalino  – recording, mixing
Anthony "Shep" Crawford – instruments, producer, writer
Sylvia Rhone – executive producer
Tamia Washington – vocals, writer
Jay Williams – guitar

Charts

References

External links
 TamiaWorld.com — official site

2001 singles
2000 songs
Tamia songs
Songs written by Shep Crawford
Songs written by Tamia
Elektra Records singles